Alba Zoe Gržin (born 1 October 1996) is a Croatian female canoeist who was finalist at five senior races at the Wildwater Canoeing World Championships.

Biography
In 2017, at the Wildwater U23 World Championships she won in C1 sprint a bronze medal, which is the first Croatian women's medal in the history of the canoeing world championships.

Achievements

References

External links
 

1996 births
Living people
Croatian female canoeists
Sportspeople from Zagreb
21st-century Croatian women